Ron Guggisberg (Sept 12, 1973) is a Democratic member of the North Dakota House of Representatives, representing the 11th district. Guggisberg is a fire department captain.

References

External links
 
Legislative page

Living people
Politicians from Fargo, North Dakota
21st-century American politicians
Year of birth missing (living people)
Democratic Party members of the North Dakota House of Representatives